Artur Sergeyevich Yelbayev (born 5 November 1988) is a Russian former professional football player.

Honours
 Top goal scorer: 2011–12 Russian Cup

External links

References

1988 births
Living people
Russian people of Ossetian descent
Russian footballers
Association football forwards
FC Spartak Vladikavkaz players
FC Tekstilshchik Ivanovo players